Drosophila ambigua is a European species of fruit fly.

It is known from most European counties, but it is not common in any of them. It is found wild in Spain, but in other countries it is only found in association with the activities of man, being found on farms, public houses, orchards, fruit stores and the like. There is speculation that it does not over winter in most of Northern Europe, but is reintroduced anew each year.

References 

a
Muscomorph flies of Europe